The Bothnian Bay or Bay of Bothnia is the northernmost part of the Gulf of Bothnia, which is in turn the northern part of the Baltic Sea. The bay today is fed by several large rivers, and is relatively unaffected by tides, so has low salinity. It freezes each year for up to six months. Compared to other parts of the Baltic it has little plant or animal life.

Extent

The bay is divided from the Bothnian Sea, the southern part of the Gulf of Bothnia, by the Northern Quark (Kvarken) strait.
It lies between a group of islands off Vaasa in Finland and another group at Holmöarna in Sweden.
The bay is bounded by Finland to the east and Sweden to the west.
The bay is asymmetric, with a smoother and shallower bottom slope on the Finnish side, and a deeper bottom with a steeper and more rugged coast on the Swedish side.

Of this, 56% lies in Finland, 44% in Sweden and less than 1% in Norway.

Isostatic rebound
The bay lies in the area in Northern Europe where the ice was at its thickest during the last ice age. The Bay of Bothnia was under ice until the "Ancylus Lake" period (7500–6000 BC), when the ice sheet withdrew to the mountains of Northern Scandinavia.
The land is now rising by post-glacial rebound at the highest rate in the Baltic Sea, at an estimated rate of  a year.
Today the Bothnian Bay lies around  higher than it did at the end of the Ice age.
The local population has seen the sea retreating during their lifetimes from piers and boathouses, leaving them stranded on land.
Some former islands such as Porsön and Hertsön near the city of Luleå are still called islands, but are now connected to the mainland.

In not less 2,000 years the exit from the bay at Kvarken will be raised above sea level, which will result in it becoming Europe's largest lake.

Hydrology

The Bothnian Bay has a harsher environment than other parts of the greater Baltic Sea.
The bay is ice-covered for 110 to 190 days each year.

Major rivers that flow into the bay include:

The salinity is only about 0.2 psu in the northern part of the bay, dropping almost to zero in some of the archipelagos with large river inflows. The low salinity and cold temperatures in winter results in ice that is considerably stronger than more saline or warmer ice.

Islands

If an island is defined as an area of land more than  that is surrounded by water, the Bay of Bothnia has 4,001 islands. The largest island is Hailuoto. The north of the bay contains a large archipelago area.
The Swedish portion of this area is the Norrbotten archipelago. This is divided into the Piteå, Luleå, Kalix and Haparanda archipelagos. Many of the islands are uninhabited and in a natural state. In the winter the larger islands may be accessed via ice roads. Some of them are inhabited or have seasonal fishing villages used by people from the mainland.

The Swedish Haparanda Archipelago National Park occupies the Haparanda group of islands, bordering the Finnish Bothnian Bay National Park. It includes the larger islands of Sandskär and Seskar Furö, and some smaller islands and skerries. All of these islands have emerged in the last 1,500 years as the bed of the bay has risen. The Bay of Bothnia National Park in the Finnish section, established in 1991, is located in the archipelago offshore from Tornio and Kemi.

Climate
The immediate coastal areas of the Bothnian Bay tend to be bordering between humid continental and subarctic climates. The summers on the coastlines are the northernmost coastlines to average above  in summer. In winter the sea freezes over, many times completely. This means that there is vast seasonal lag offshore such as on the island of Rödkallen on the Swedish side. Due to the mild nature of summers and the low diurnals, offshore islands tend to be humid continental since September usually stays above  means.

Ecology

The Quark ridge at the south of the bay defines the dividing line beyond which many salt water species are unable to survive.
Instead of the red and brown algae found further south, the bay has predominantly green algae and phanerogams.
Annual plant species are almost completely dominant. The only perennials are a few specimens of the freshwater cryptogam Isoetes echinospora and the moss Fontinalis dalecarlica.
Often the green algae have a dense covering of epiphytic diatoms.
The shores, beaches and shallows include a variety of northern plant species including the endemic yellow hair grass (Deschampsia bottnica).

The only filter feeders are Ephydatia and, at the river mouths, small numbers of freshwater mussels.
Bivalves make up 9% of animal biomass. Crustaceans, mostly Saduria entomon make up 45% and gastropoda 30%.
The gastropoda are grazing snails related to freshwater species.

Fish species found in the area's lakes and rivers also live in the bay, including roach, perch, pike and grayling.

Ringed seal, grey seal, cod, herring and salmon may also be found in the bay.
In the 16th century seals were hunted in the Bay of Bothnia. Ringed seals were captured using nets in the inshore open water, and were stalked and captured in their dens or at breathing holes. Both grey and ringed seals were hunted along the edge of the ice.
Wild vendace roe harvested from the Kalix River, known as Kalix Löjrom or as sea gold, 
is a delicacy with a European protected designation of origin.

Birdlife includes the black guillemot, velvet scoter, oystercatcher, lesser black-backed gull, western capercaillie and willow ptarmigan.
Moose and hare are found on the islands, as on the mainland.

Occasionally, whales have been observed in Bothnian Sea and remains of extinct Atlantic gray whale was found from Gräsö while it is not clear whether or not whales might once have reached Bothnian Bay historically.

Population

Ports on the Finnish side include Haukipudas, Jakobstad, Kemi, Kokkola, Oulu, Raahe and Tornio.
The largest towns by population on the Finnish side as of 2013 were Oulu (192,680), Tornio (22,374), Kemi (22,157), Kempele (16,549), Raahe (25,641), Kalajoki (12,637), Kokkola (46,697) and Jakobstad (19,636). There were four Finnish pulp and paper mills, of which two (Veitsiluoto Oy and Metsä Botnia Oy) were producing bleached kraft paper.

On the Swedish side ports include Haparanda, Karlsborg, Kalix, Luleå, Piteå and Skellefteå.
The largest towns on the Swedish side as of 2013 were Luleå (74,000), Skellefteå (71,641), Piteå (40,860) and Kalix (16,926).
Luleå is the largest city in Norrbotten, with the largest airport. The 1,312 islands of the Luleå archipelago are an important tourist attraction, as is the Gammelstad church village, listed as a Unesco World Heritage site. There were five pulp and paper mills, of which one produced bleached kraft paper.

In the late 1960s the bay was being used to transport fuel oil to the Finnish settlements around the bay. In 1968 about 950,000 tons of cellulose and 230,600 tons of paper and cardboard were exported, a figure that was rising. In 1968 ships calling at the Finnish ports carried about 388,872 tons of iron bars and 64,326 tons of steel sheets. Mining and mineral products such as coal and ore were carried to and from the ports, and steel products were exported.
Sea transport continued throughout the winter. In 1993 there were two non-ferrous heavy metal smelters, in Rönnskär and Kokkola, emitting significant quantities of heavy metals. Efforts were being made to reduce emissions. The drainage basin also held three iron and steel plants and a number of mines.

Human activities have affected the fragile sub-arctic environment. Dredging and other activities related to sea transport affect marine life.
Agriculture, forestry and peat mining in the catchment basin add nutrients to the bay, affecting the ecological balance, while pollutants are delivered from steel mills and from pulp and paper mills around the bay, as well as from sewage treatment plants. Steel mills and stainless steel plants may have released nickel and chromium. Efforts have been made to reduce pollution through improved technology, but some areas along the Finnish coastline show evidence of eutrophication. Compared to other parts of the Baltic, higher levels of nitrate have been found in the Bothnian Bay and lower levels of phosphate and silicates.

Gallery

References
Citations

Sources

Gulf of Bothnia
Landforms of Norrbotten County
Landforms of Västerbotten County